Corynebacterium minutissimum is a species of Corynebacterium associated with erythrasma, a type of skin rash. It can be distinguished from similar-appearing rashes by exposing the area to the light of a Wood's lamp; C. minutissimum produces porphyrins that fluoresce coral-red.

References

External links
 Type strain of Corynebacterium minutissimum at BacDive -  the Bacterial Diversity Metadatabase

Corynebacterium
Gram-positive bacteria